Death effector domain containing protein is a protein that in humans is encoded by the DEDD gene.

Function 

This gene encodes a protein that contains a death effector domain (DED). DED is a protein–protein interaction domain shared by adaptors, regulators and executors of the programmed cell death pathway. Overexpression of this gene was shown to induce weak apoptosis. Upon stimulation, this protein was found to translocate from cytoplasm to nucleus and colocalize with UBTF, a basal factor required for RNA polymerase I transcription, in the nucleolus. At least three transcript variants encoding the same protein have been found for this gene.

Interactions 

DEDD has been shown to interact with:
 CFLAR,
 Caspase 8,  and
 FADD.

References

Further reading